The Tenerife gecko (Tarentola delalandii), also known commonly as Delalande's gecko and the Tenerife wall gecko, is a species of lizard in the family Phyllodactylidae.

Etymology
The specific name, delalandii, is in honor of French naturalist Pierre Antoine Delalande.

Geographic range
T. delalandii is endemic to Tenerife and La Palma, Canary Islands, Spain.

Habitat

Reproduction
T. delalandii is oviparous. The eggs are laid under rocks.

Conservation status
T. delalandii is threatened by habitat loss.

References

Further reading
Boulenger GA (1885). Catalogue of the Lizards in the British Museum (Natural History). Second Edition. Volume I. Geckonidæ ... London: Trustees of the British Museum (Natural History). (Taylor and Francis, printers). xii + 436 pp. + Plates I-XXXII. (Tarentola delalandii, pp. 199, 414).
Duméril AMC, Bibron G (1836). Erpétologie générale ou Histoire naturelle complète des Reptiles, Tome troisième [Volume 3]. Paris: Roret. iv + 517 pp. (Platydactylus delalandii, new species, pp. 324–325). (in French).
Sindaco R, Jeremčenko VK (2008). The Reptiles of the Western Palearctic. 1. Annotated Checklist and Distributional Atlas of the Turtles, Crocodiles, Amphisbaenians and Lizards of Europe, North Africa, Middle East and Central Asia. (Monographs of the Societas Herpetologica Italica). Latina, Italy: Edizioni Belvedere. 580 pp. .

Tarentola
Reptiles of the Canary Islands
Reptiles described in 1836
Taxa named by André Marie Constant Duméril
Taxa named by Gabriel Bibron
Taxonomy articles created by Polbot